Coptis japonica, the Japanese goldthread, is a species of flowering plant in the family Ranunculaceae, native to central and southern Japan, and introduced to Korea. In Asia it is grown for medicinal purposes, with the main alkaloid being berberine.

References

External links 
 Coptis japonica

japonica
Medicinal plants of Asia
Endemic flora of Japan
Plants described in 1899